The canton of Maringues is an administrative division of the Puy-de-Dôme department, central France. Its borders were modified at the French canton reorganisation which came into effect in March 2015. Its seat is in Maringues.

It consists of the following communes:
 
Bas-et-Lezat
Beaumont-lès-Randan
Charnat
Châteldon
Lachaux
Limons
Luzillat
Maringues
Mons
Noalhat
Paslières
Puy-Guillaume
Randan
Ris
Saint-André-le-Coq
Saint-Clément-de-Régnat
Saint-Denis-Combarnazat
Saint-Priest-Bramefant
Saint-Sylvestre-Pragoulin
Villeneuve-les-Cerfs

References

Cantons of Puy-de-Dôme